Khandu Goth is a neighborhood in the Karachi Central district of Karachi, Pakistan.

There are several ethnic groups in Khandu Goth including Punjabis mainly Mughals, Muhajirs, Sindhis, Kashmiris, Seraikis, Pakhtuns, Balochis, Memons, Bohras and Ismailis.

References

External links 
 Karachi Website

Neighbourhoods of Karachi
North Nazimabad Town
Karachi Central District